Moscow District may refer to:
Moskovsky District, name of several districts in the countries of the former Soviet Union
Moscow Military District (1864–2010), a former military district of Russia
One of the districts of Moscow, Russia